Jarosław Mucha (born 25 May 1997) is a Polish volleyball player, a member of Polish club KS Norwid Częstochowa U23, U21 World Champion 2017.

Career

National team
On July 2, 2017 Poland U21, including Gil, achieved title of U21 World Champion 2017 after beating Cuba U21 in the finale (3–0). His national team won 48 matches in the row and never lost.

Sporting achievements

National team
 2017  FIVB U21 World Championship

References

1997 births
Living people
People from Jasło
Sportspeople from Podkarpackie Voivodeship
Polish men's volleyball players